Richard H. Weyl (10 August 1912, Kiel - 1988) was a German geologist and noted author on the subject of Central American Geology.

Active member of the Bundesanstalt für Geowissenschaften und Rohstoffe (BGR, Federal Institute for Geosciences and Natural Resources; formerly the Bundesanstalt für Bodenforschung, BfB) in Latin-America and the Caribbean.

1941-1956 Scientist at Paläontologisches Institut und Museum (University of Kiel, Germany)

Since 1956 Professor at the University of Giessen, Geologisch-Paläontologisches Institut.

Apparently there is a peak in Costa Rica named after him. (Near Mount Chirripó)

Education 
Ph.D. Geology (University of Heidelberg, 1936)

Works Published 

Die Geologie Mittelamerikas (The Geology of Central America)/ von Dr. Richard Weyl.
Berlin-Nikolassee : Gebruder Borntraeger, 1961. 

Geologie der Antillen / Richard Weil.
Berlin-Nikolassee : Borntraeger, 1966.

Geology of Central America / by Richard Weyl.
Berlin : Gebr. Borntraeger, 1980.

References 
Departmental History Webpage by Hubert Miller  <webpage now defunct>

List mentioning correspondence with Weyl 

Costa Rica Guides: Mountains and Volcanos 

Der Nationalsozialismus und Lateinamerika by Sandra Carreras 

Richard Weyl 1912-1988 by Ekke W. Guenther.

External links
 Weyl, Richard entry at National Library of Australia

1912 births
1988 deaths
20th-century German geologists